The 1992 Florida Gators football team represented the University of Florida during the 1992 NCAA Division I-A football season. The season was Steve Spurrier's third as the Florida Gators football team's head coach, and the wins were harder to come by as the star-studded senior classes from 1990 and 1991 had graduated.  The Gators racked up six tough Southeastern Conference (SEC) wins over the Kentucky Wildcats (35–19), LSU Tigers (28–21), Auburn Tigers (24–9), seventh-ranked Georgia Bulldogs (26–24), South Carolina Gamecocks (14–9), and  Vanderbilt Commodores (41–21).  They also suffered two crushing SEC losses to the fourteenth-ranked Tennessee Volunteers (14–31) in Knoxville, Tennessee, and the twenty-fourth-ranked Mississippi State Bulldogs (6–30) on a Thursday night in Starkville, Mississippi.

The Gators' non-conference schedule included a homecoming victory over the Louisville Cardinals (31–17), and another surprisingly difficult win over Southern Miss Golden Eagles (24–20).  They closed their regular season with a road loss to the third-ranked Florida State Seminoles (24–45) in Tallahassee.

The Gators finished their SEC schedule with a 6–2 conference record, placing first among the six teams of the new SEC Eastern Division and earning a berth in the first-ever SEC Championship Game in Birmingham, Alabama.  Spurrier's scrappy young Gators, however, fell short against the SEC Western Division champion, the second-ranked Alabama Crimson Tide (21–28).  The Crimson Tide later defeated the Miami Hurricanes in the Sugar Bowl to win the 1992 national championship.

Spurrier's 1992 Florida Gators posted a 9–4 overall record, concluding their season with a victory over the twelfth-ranked NC State Wolfpack (27–10) in the Gator Bowl, and ranking tenth in the final AP Poll.

Schedule

Primary source: 2015 Florida Gators Football Media Guide.

Roster

References

Florida
Florida Gators football seasons
Gator Bowl champion seasons
Florida Gators football